Metarctia aethiops is a moth of the subfamily Arctiinae. It was described by Sergius G. Kiriakoff in 1973. It is found in Malawi.

References

Metarctia
Moths described in 1973